Bąkowiec Castle is a fourteenth-century knight's castle ruins, located in the Kraków-Częstochowa Upland. The fortress was built as part of the Trail of the Eagles' Nests defence system, located in the village of Morsko, Silesian Voivodeship in Poland.

See also
 Castles in Poland

References

Castles in Silesian Voivodeship